And Quiet Flows the Don is a 1930 Soviet film directed by Ivan Pravov and Olga Preobrazhenskaya.

Plot 
The film is an adaptation of the first two books of the eponymous novel by Mikhail Sholokhov.

Cast 
 Nikolay Podgorny as Pantelej Prokofievich Melekhov 
 Andrei Abrikosov as Grigori Pantelejevich Melekhov
 Emma Tsesarskaya as Aksinya Astagova
 Raisa Puzhnaya as Natalya Koshonova
 Aleksandr Gromov as Petr Melekhov
 Georgi Kovrov as Stepan Astakhov
 Yelena Maksimova as Daria Melekhova
 S. Churakovskaya as Aksinja
 Vasili Kovrigin as Prokofij Melekhov
 Ivan Bykov as Garandza
 Leonid Yurenev as Gendarm

References

External links 

1930 films
Soviet silent feature films
Soviet drama films
Soviet black-and-white films
1930 drama films
Silent drama films